Brack may refer to:

People
 Brack (surname)
 Brack Cantrell, a former member of the American post-hardcore band Sky Eats Airplane
 Brack Cornett (1841–1888), Texas outlaw

Other uses
 The Brack, a mountain in the Arrochar Alps of Scotland
 Barmbrack, often shortened to brack, a quick bread
 Brack., author abbreviation of William Brackenridge (1810–1893), Scottish nurseryman and botanist
 Brackenridge Hospital

See also
 Brak (disambiguation)
 Bräcke, a municipality in Sweden
 BRAC Bank Limited, a commercial bank in Bangladesh
 Brackish water, naturally occurring water with high salinity, also known as brack water